Perierges Meres (Greek: Περίεργες Μέρες; English: Strange Days) is the nineteenth studio album by popular Greek artist, Katy Garbi.

It was released on 10 December 2013 by Front Seat Records, a Minos EMI label, and received platinum certification, selling over 12,000 units. The album marked the singer's comeback in the night life of Athens and her return to laiko music style. On 26 January 2014, the album was released as a covermount along with the newspaper Proto Thema. In March 2014 it was announced that the album has reached gold status. In November 2014, the album was re-released as a covermount that it has reached platinum status.

Singles

Perierges Μeres produced three singles prior its release and contain two more from Garbi's two latest albums.

"Pio Pano Apo Sena"

"Pio Pano Apo Esena" is the first single (music: Vasilis Gavriilidis, lyrics: Thanos Papanikolaou) which marks a return for Garbi to the laïko style of Greek commercial music, in a collaboration with Giannis Doxas, all notable for commercial Greek music. Garbi has previously worked with Giannis Doxas on albums such as Os Ton Paradeiso, Arhizo Polemo and most recently Emmones Idees in 2003. It was officially released through Sony Music Greece's imprint Front Seat via the label's YouTube channel on 14 December 2012. The song premiered on 10 December on Sfera Radio, during an interview with Garbi held for the station's 4th year celebration of "Greek Music Week". The single debuted at 72 on the Airplay Top 100 powered by Media Inspector, and has since peaked at 14.

"Stin Adeia Sou Karekla"

In July 2013, Garbi announced a new collaboration with Vasilis Gavriilidis and Thanos Papanikolaou on a new single. On 23 September 2013, Garbi released the second single titled "Stin Adeia Sou Karekla" for an upcoming album. This song marked a return to her the laika style after two albums that were more concentrated on the alternative Greek genre. The track premiered exclusively via Lampsi FM 92.3 and it gained a lot of airplay.

"Anemodarmena Ipsi"

The third single of the album is the song "Anemodarmena Ipsi" which was chosen as album's lead single. The creators of the song are Giorgos Sabanis in music (singer and musician with many success the last years in Greece) and Eleni Giannatsoulia in lyrics (lyricist and an old collaborator of Katy's with many hits in Greek discography for two and more decades). The single was released on 20 November 2013 via Katy's official account on YouTube and two days later, on 22 November 2013 was released its official videoclip on Katy's official YouTube account too. Only on the first day of its release, "Anemodarmena Ipsi" achieved more than 24.000 views on YouTube and peaked at number one on Greek i-tunes. The video clip was directed by Victoria Vellopoulou.

The airplay success of the single placed it at number 20 on the MediaInspector Top 200 Airplay tracks of 2015 and number 125 the following year, making it one of Garbi's most successful tracks of the decade.

"Ena Gelio Tha Foreso"

This is the fourth single of the album that was released on 4 December 2013 via Front Seat (Katy's label) YouTube account only as a promotional single in contrast to the other singles. The song is written by Tasos Panagis (music) and Nikos Gritsis (lyrics), both old collaborators of Katy's.

"Psefti"

Katy's fifth single was produced via voting on Katy's official page by fans. The song is written by Giorgos Sabanis (music) and Nikos Gritsis (lyrics). The results of the voting were announced on 23 December 2013 with a video where Katy is singing live the song. The single was released on 23 January 2014 and the same day was announced that a video clip is preparing. On 20 March 2014, the video clip was released via Katy's official YouTube channel. The video is the first act of a sequel with another videoclip which is to be released for the song "Pame Finale".

"Pame Finale"

Katy's sixth single is the song "Pame Finale". The song is written by Giorgos Papadopoulos (music) and Vicky Gerothodorou with Giannis Doxas (lyrics). On 23 January 2014, it was announced that the song will be the next single of the album. On 3 February 2014, it was announced that a mash-up video clip is preparing too (with the song "Psefti"). Finally, the song was released as a radio single on 7 May 2014 and the video clip was released on 2 June 2014 via Katy's Vevo Channel on YouTube.

"Logia Meli"

The seventh single of the album is the song "Logia Meli", a cover of "Betigy Osady". The music is written by Ayman Bahgat Amr and Greek lyrics are written by Katy's producer and lyricist Giannis Doxas. The single was released as a remix version by Spiros Metaxas named Aegean Blue remix via both Katy's and her label's YouTube account on 6 August 2014.

Track listing

Credits

Personnel 
Dimitris Antoniadis: drums (tracks: 2, 7, 12)

Panagiotis Apostolidis: baglama, bouzouki (tracks: 12)

Ilias Argiropoulos: piano (tracks: 14)

Alexandros Arkadopoulos: clarinet (tracks: 4)

Panagiotis Brakoulias: backing vocals (tracks: 10) || baglama (tracks: 7, 9) || bouzouki (tracks: 2, 7) || cura (tracks: 1, 4, 6, 8, 9) || guitars (tracks: 1, 2, 4, 6, 7, 8, 9, 10, 11) || keyboards, orchestration, programming (tracks: 6) || oud (tracks: 1, 4, 8)

Akis Diximos: backing vocals (tracks: 8, 10) || second vocal (tracks: 2, 7)

Vasilis Gavriilidis: keyboards, orchestration, programming (tracks: 3, 12)

Stelios Generalis: drums (tracks: 14)

Antonis Gounaris: baglama, cura, cümbüş (tracks: 3) || guitars (tracks: 3, 12)

Giannis Grigoriou: bass (tracks: 2, 3, 7, 12)

Pantelis Konstantinidis: bouzouki (tracks: 14)

Tasos Limperis: percussion (tracks: 6)

Dimitris Liolios: second vocal (tracks: 5)

Spiros Mazis: bass (tracks: 14)

Telis Michael: guitars (tracks: 14)

Alkis Misirlis: drums (tracks: 3)

Tasos Panagis: keyboards, orchestration, programming (tracks: 5)

Giorgos Papadopoulos: backing vocals (tracks: 6, 9, 11)

Dimitris Paraskevopoulos: accordion (tracks: 3)

Elena Patroklou: backing vocals (tracks: 3, 12)

Christos Pertsinidis: guitars (tracks: 5)

Giorgos Sousounis: violin (tracks: 6)

Panagiotis Stergiou: baglama, bouzouki (tracks: 5)

Zoi Tiganouria: accordion, orchestration (tracks: 14)

Leonidas Tzitzos: keyboards, orchestration, programming (tracks: 1, 2, 3, 4, 7, 8, 9, 10, 11)

Production 
Stamatis Arapakis: art direction

Aris Binis (Vox studio): mix engineer, sound engineer (tracks: 3, 5)

Panagiotis Brakoulias (Track Factory Recording studio): mix engineer, sound engineer (tracks: 1, 2, 4, 6, 7, 8, 9, 10, 11)

Tasos Chamosfakidis (Workshop studio): mix engineer, sound engineer (tracks: 12)

Achilleas Charitos: make up

Alexandros Chrisidis (Sierra studio): mix engineer, sound engineer (tracks: 14)

Giannis Doxas: production manager

Giannis Gkiouras (New Sound studio): mastering (tracks: 12)

Petros Paraschis: artwork

Paul Stefanidis (Viking Lounge studio): mastering (tracks: 1, 2, 3, 4, 5, 6, 7, 8, 9, 10, 11, 13)

Stefanos Vasilakis: hair styling

Victoria Vellopoulou: photographer

Chart performance
Perierges Meres debuted on the IFPI Top 75 Album Charts at number 7. It retained the same position the following week. On its sixth week the album rose to a new peak position at number 5. On the iTunes Greek chart, the album peaked at number 1 on its very first day of release. After weeks on the charts, it was certified platinum by IFPI.

Awards

Perierges Meres earned Garbi an award nomination at the 2015 MAD Video Music Awards (Greece). Garbi performed a duet of "Anemodarmena Ipsi" alongside Stan at the awards ceremony in June 2015.

References

External links
Official website

Katy Garbi albums
2013 albums
Minos EMI albums